Tom McCarthy (born July 5, 1968) is an American sports broadcaster. He is the play-by-play announcer for Philadelphia Phillies television broadcasts and also calls National Football League games for Westwood One. He calls select NFL, NBA and college basketball games on CBS beginning in 2014. McCarthy previously served as the play-by-play voice of Saint Joseph's University men's and women's basketball teams.

Broadcast career
McCarthy spent five seasons with the Philadelphia Phillies (2001–05) as a radio play-by-play voice and as their pre-game and post-game radio host. Before then, he served as the play-by-play announcer for the Double-A Trenton Thunder for six seasons (1994–99). He has also been a play-by-play voice for Rutgers University football and for national football and basketball broadcasts on the CBS Sports Network (formerly known as CSTV), the Atlantic 10 TV network, Westwood One, and the Sports USA Radio Network.

After two seasons (2006–07), as a play-by-play announcer for the National League East rival New York Mets on WFAN, McCarthy signed a five-year deal to return to Philadelphia beginning with the 2008 season. Following the death of Harry Kalas early in the 2009 season, McCarthy took over television play-by-play on a full-time basis. McCarthy is one of three broadcasters to have covered both the Mets and Phillies on a regular basis (the others being Tim McCarver and Todd Kalas).

McCarthy spent nearly a decade broadcasting Princeton University football and men's basketball. He was the play-by-play voice for the Tigers during their 43–41 upset win over defending NCAA champion UCLA in the 1996 NCAA tournament and during their 27–2 run through the 1997–98 season. In 2009, McCarthy did play-by-play of the 2009 Caribbean Series for the MLB Network from their studios in Secaucus, New Jersey with Boston Red Sox Spanish language radio announcer Uri Berenguer on the color commentary.

McCarthy has called a game for Fox NFL Sunday as well as MLB games on Fox, most of them involving the Phillies. He is a broadcaster for the NFL on CBS. His current partner is Tiki Barber. McCarthy is one of the current broadcasters who cover both NFL and MLB. In 2020, he called his first primetime NFL game in a Tuesday night matchup between the Buffalo Bills and the Tennessee Titans. McCarthy serves as the play-by-play announcer for Cleveland Browns preseason games alongside color commentator, Joe Thomas.

On January 9, 2022, McCarthy filled in for CBS' lead NFL play–by–play announcer Jim Nantz for a game featuring the Carolina Panthers and Tampa Bay Buccaneers. Nantz had to sit out that week's broadcast alongside color commentator Tony Romo due to COVID protocols.

McCarthy became part of a growing list of broadcasters to be interrupted by a Nick Castellanos play while discussing a serious topic on May 30, 2022, when the Phillies outfielder hit a home run right after McCarthy finished telling viewers about the American Gold Star Mothers Chair of Honor in Citizens Bank Park.

Personal life
McCarthy graduated from Brick Memorial High School in Brick, New Jersey in 1986 and is a 1990 graduate of Trenton State College (now The College of New Jersey). At Trenton State, he was a brother of the Phi Gamma Chi chapter of Alpha Chi Rho.  He currently lives with his wife Meg in Allentown, New Jersey. His son Pat is also an announcer for the New York Mets.

References

External links

 Tom McCarthy biography at mlb.com
 

1968 births
Living people
American male journalists
American radio sports announcers
American television sports announcers
Brick Memorial High School alumni
College basketball announcers in the United States
College football announcers
The College of New Jersey alumni
Major League Baseball broadcasters
Minor League Baseball broadcasters
National Football League announcers
New York Mets announcers
People from Allentown, New Jersey
Philadelphia Phillies announcers
Princeton Tigers football announcers
Rutgers Scarlet Knights football announcers
Sportspeople from Brick Township, New Jersey
Sportspeople from Ocean County, New Jersey
Women's college basketball announcers in the United States